Invisible Map is the twelfth studio album by experimental music ensemble Biota, released on June 5, 2001 by ReR Megacorp.

Reception 
AllMusic.com states, "With its wide range covering delicate post-folkish pop songs to ambient soundscapes, Invisible Map may be the collective's most accomplished and accessible release to date. All music styles (folk, jazz, blues, rock, musique concrète, free improv, etc.) coalesce to be filtered through the dreamer's ears — background vocals are slightly treated, soloing instruments are heard from a distance, rhythm tracks are deliberately just a bit out of sync. This way, the simple tunes never really come into focus, giving the whole album an aura of mystery."

Track listing

Personnel 
Adapted from the Invisible Map liner notes.

Biota
 James Gardner – Rhodes piano, flugelhorn, trumpet, flute, Irish tin whistle, percussion
 Geneviève Heistek – lead vocals, backing vocals, violin
 Tom Katsimpalis – guitar, bass guitar, mandolin, balalaika, clavioline, pump organ, ocarina, backing vocals
 Steve Scholbe – bass clarinet, alto saxophone, clarinet, guitar, bass guitar, zither, rubab, Hawaiian tremoloa, hurdy-gurdy, Marxophone
 William Sharp – tape, hurdy-gurdy, engineering, mixing
 C.W. Vrtacek – piano
 Gordon H. Whitlow – accordion, Rhodes piano, Estey pump organ, clavioline, backing vocals
 Larry Wilson – drums, bongos, congas, Madal, percussion
 Randy Yeates – keyboards

Additional musicians
 Andy Kredt – guitar (2, 35, 36)
 Mark Piersel – guitar (6, 21, 22, 24)
Production and additional personnel
 Biota – production, mixing, arrangements
 Randy Miotke – engineering

Release history

References

External links 
 Invisible Map at Discogs (list of releases)

2001 albums
Biota (band) albums
Recommended Records albums